Francis Alexander (1800–1881) was an American painter.

Francis Alexander may also refer to:

Francis Alexander, Prince of Nassau-Hadamar (1674–1711)
Francis Alexander (cricketer) (1911–2005)

See also
Frank Alexander (disambiguation)
Frances Alexander (disambiguation)